Nesotettix is a genus of groundhoppers belonging to the subfamily Cladonotinae.

The species of this genus are found in Central America.

Species:

Nesotettix cheesmanae 
Nesotettix samoensis

References

Tetrigidae
Caelifera genera